The dorsal digital arteries of foot are small arteries which supply the toes.

See also
 Dorsal digital arteries of hand

External links
 http://www.dartmouth.edu/~humananatomy/figures/chapter_17/17-3.HTM 

Arteries of the lower limb